Nils Andreas Stensønes (born 24 August 1964) is a Norwegian military officer who serves as the Head of the Norwegian Intelligence Service since October 2020. He served as Chief of the Navy from August 2017 to October 2020.

In September 2020, he was appointed as Head of the Intelligence Service; he began his work in this position on 3 November 2020, taking over from Morten Haga Lunde.

Military medals and awards

References 

Living people
1964 births
Place of birth missing (living people)
Royal Norwegian Navy admirals